Homonota fasciata, also known as the South American marked gecko, is a nocturnal species of gecko. It lives in Bolivia, and in Argentina. It is found in tropical deciduous forest and desert scrub habitats. It feeds on insects.

References

Homonota
Reptiles of Bolivia
Reptiles of Argentina
Reptiles described in 1836
Geckos
Taxa named by André Marie Constant Duméril
Taxa named by Gabriel Bibron